This is a list of prisoner of war camps in Australia during World War II.

During World War II many enemy aliens were interned in Australia under the National Security Act 1939. Prisoners of war were also sent to Australia from other Allied countries for internment in Australia.

Internment camps were established for three reasons – to prevent residents from assisting Australia's enemies, to appease public opinion and to house overseas internees sent to Australia for the duration of the war. Unlike World War I, the initial aim of internment was to identify and intern those who posed a particular threat to the safety or defence of the country. As the war progressed, however, this policy changed and Japanese residents were interned en masse. In the later years of the war, Germans and Italians were also interned on the basis of nationality, particularly those living in the north of Australia. In all, just over 20 per cent of all Italians resident in Australia were interned.

During World War II, Australia interned about 7000 residents, including more than 1500 British nationals. A further 8000 people were sent to Australia to be interned after being detained overseas by Australia's allies. At its peak in 1942, more than 12,000 people were interned in Australia.

New South Wales

Queensland

South Australia

Tasmania

Victoria

Western Australia

References

External links 
Tatura World War 2 Wartime Camps & Irrigation Museum
The Enemy At Home – Germans In World War One Australia (online exhibition)
Loveday Project (research project about Japanese civilians interned in Australia)
  [CC-By-SA]

Prisoner of war camps in Australia
Australia
 
POW camps
Prisoner of war camps in Australia